Shurcheh (also Romanized as Shūrcheh) is a village in Borkhar-e Sharqi Rural District, Habibabad District, Borkhar County, Isfahan Province, Iran. At the 2006 census, its population was 32, in 12 families.

References 

Populated places in Borkhar County